Lord Price may be:

 Peter Price (bishop) (born 1944), retired Anglican bishop
 Mark Price, Baron Price (born 1961), British businessman